Selmar Odelein (born April 11, 1966) is a Canadian former professional ice hockey player who played 18 games in the National Hockey League.

Playing career
Odelein started his career with the Regina Pats in the Western Hockey League and was the first round pick of the Edmonton Oilers in the 1984 NHL Entry Draft, 21st overall. He attended Luther College high school in Regina, Saskatchewan.

Odelein scored 0 goals and 2 assists in 18 games over three seasons with the Edmonton Oilers and also played with the Oilers' affiliates before spending a season with Team Canada. He spent two years in Austria playing for Innsbrucker EV and Feldkirch VEU before moving to the British Hockey League. He played a season each for the Nottingham Panthers and Sheffield Steelers before injury forced him to retire.

Odelein's brother Lyle won a Stanley Cup with the Montreal Canadiens in 1992–93.  Another brother, Lee, also played professionally in Europe.

Career statistics

References 

1966 births
Living people
Canadian people of German descent
Canadian ice hockey defencemen
Edmonton Oilers draft picks
Edmonton Oilers players
HC TWK Innsbruck players
Ice hockey people from Saskatchewan
National Hockey League first-round draft picks
Nottingham Panthers players
Nova Scotia Oilers players
Regina Pats players
Sheffield Steelers players
VEU Feldkirch players
Cape Breton Oilers players
Canadian expatriate ice hockey players in England
Canadian expatriate ice hockey players in Austria